George Miley may refer to:

 George H. Miley (born 1933), physicist, professor emeritus at University of Illinois
 George K. Miley (born 1942), physicist, professor of astronomy at Leiden University

See also 
 Miley (surname)
 Miley (disambiguation)